agilis Eisenbahngesellschaft (railway company) and agilis Verkehrsgesellschaft (transportation company) operate railway passenger services in Bavaria. The companies do not capitalise their names. They are subsidiaries of BeNEX GmbH and the Hamburger Hochbahn, both based in Hamburg. BeNEX is owned by the Hamburger Hochbahn (51%) and International Public Partnerships Limited (49%).

References

External links
 

Rail transport in Bavaria
Railway companies of Germany
Private railway companies of Germany